Bertholdia crocea is a moth of the family Erebidae. It was described by Schaus in 1910. It is found in Costa Rica and Nicaragua.

References

Phaegopterina
Moths described in 1910